Simoh, the Unlucky Man (French: Si Moh, pas de chance) is a 1971 Moroccan short film by Moumen Smihi. It was shot in 16 mm, in black and white.

Synopsis 
The film follows Si Moh (Abdeslam Sakini), a North African immigrant looking for a job in Paris. He wanders around the French banlieues, eventually gets lost, and ultimately spends his first night on the stairs of a subway station.

References

External links 
 

1971 films
Moroccan short films